Malý Lapáš is a village and municipality in the Nitra District in western central Slovakia, in the Nitra Region.

History
In historical records the village was first mentioned in 1394.

Geography
The village lies at an altitude of 170 metres and covers an area of 3.219 km². It has a population of about 386 people.

Ethnicity
The village is approximately 98% Slovak and 2% Magyar.

Facilities
The village has a public library.

References

External links
https://www.webcitation.org/5QjNYnAux?url=http://www.statistics.sk/mosmis/eng/run.html

Villages and municipalities in Nitra District